Amanda Marshall is the 1995 debut album by Canadian singer Amanda Marshall. The album peaked at number four on the RPM Albums Chart and has also been certified Diamond by the CRIA with over 1,000,000 copies sold in Canada, making it Marshall's best-selling album of her career. In the United States, the album charted at number 156 on the Billboard 200 and sold over 350,000 copies. It was particularly successful in Norway, where it reached number one and received a Platinum certification. The album sold 2 million copies worldwide.

Seven songs from the album were released as singles: "Let It Rain", "Birmingham", "Fall from Grace", "Beautiful Goodbye", "Dark Horse", "Sitting on Top of the World", and "Trust Me (This Is Love)". "Birmingham" is Marshall's highest-charting song in Canada, peaking at number three. "Fall from Grace", "Dark Horse", and "Sitting on Top of the World" all reached the top five. "Let It Rain" is her most successful international hit, reaching number three in Norway and the top 30 in Australia and New Zealand; it was certified Gold in Norway.

Track listing
 "Let It Rain" (Kristen Hall) – 4:33
 "Birmingham" (Dean McTaggart, David Tyson, Gerald O'Brien) – 5:21
 "Fall from Grace" (Marc Jordan, Kim Bullard) – 4:20
 "Dark Horse" (Amanda Marshall, David Tyson, Dean McTaggart) – 5:37
 "Beautiful Goodbye" (David Tyson, Chistopher Ward) – 5:17
 "Sitting on Top of the World" (Amanda Marshall) – 4:19
 "Last Exit to Eden" (Dean McTaggart, David Tyson) – 5:24
 "Trust Me (This is Love)" (Dean McTaggart, David Tyson) – 4:59
 "Let's Get Lost" (Amanda Marshall, Christopher Ward) – 4:14
 "Promises" (John Capek, Marc Jordan) – 5:22

Personnel
 Amanda Marshall – vocals, background vocals
 Kenny Aronoff – drums, percussion
 Leland Sklar – bass guitar
 Tommy Byrnes – electric guitars
 David Wipper – acoustic guitars, mandolin
 Bob Mann – acoustic guitar
 Diana DeWitt – background vocals
 David Tyson – background vocals
 Tom "T-Bone" Wolk – accordion
 Peter Kent – violin
 Erica Duke-Kirkpatrick – cello
 Louis Taylor – soprano saxophone
 David Tyson – keyboards, programming

Charts

Weekly charts

Year-end charts

Certifications

References

Amanda Marshall albums
1995 debut albums
Sony Music Canada albums